Frederik Vesti (born 13 January 2002) is a Danish racing driver who is currently competing in the FIA Formula 2 Championship with Prema Racing. He is a member of the Mercedes Junior Team and the inaugural champion of the Formula Regional European Championship.

Racing career

Karting 
Vesti starting karting competitively in 2012, at the age of 10. He went on to win many Danish karting competitions, including the Danish championship in 2014 for the KFJ category. He raced in the 2015 edition of the Karting World Championship, where he ended 69th. Vesti continued karting until 2016.

Lower formulae

2016 
Vesti started his career in Danish Formula Ford, in which he managed to finish fourth in the championship.

2017 
In 2017, Vesti competed German and Danish Formula 4 Championships. Despite missing two events of the Danish Championship the Danish driver managed to finish second in his debut F4 season, finishing all races on the podium and helping his team, Vesti Motorsport to win the team championship. In the German championship, Vesti took his first podium by taking second in the second round at Lausitzring. Two rounds later, he would claim his first and only win of the season. Vesti took another podium en route to finishing seventh in the standings. Vesti also made a one-off appearance in the Formula 4 United States Championship during the final round.

2018 
In 2018 he would yet again compete in the German F4 Championship with Van Amersfoort Racing. After starting the season with two podiums in the opening two rounds, he claimed his maiden win during the second Hockenheimring round. His second win came during the next round at the Nürburgring. Vesti eventually ended fourth in the standings, collecting six other podiums along with his two wins. The Danish driver also participated in one round at Circuit Paul Ricard during the Italian F4 Championship with VAR. Vesti claimed two wins in the three races, which placed him tenth in the championship. Vesti also participated in the final round of the European Formula 3 Championship. He made his debut in the Macau Grand Prix, where he finished 15th.

Formula Regional European Championship 
Prema Powerteam signed Vesti to compete in the inaugural Formula Regional European Championship. Vesti dominated the championship, claiming 13 victories, with six of them being achieved back-to-back, and a total of 20 podium finishes Vesti won the championship with 467 points, 131 in front of Ferrari Academy driver and teammate Enzo Fittipaldi. They, along with British driver Olli Caldwell helped Prema to win the team championship. At the end of the season, Vesti again raced in the Macau Grand Prix, but this time was called up to replace an injured Jehan Daruvala at Prema Powerteam. He ended the race in tenth place. In an article by Motorsport.com he was ranked 13th in their top 20 junior single-seater drivers of 2019.

FIA Formula 3 Championship

2020 
Vesti tested for Prema Racing during the 2019 post-season test. At the start of January 2020, Vesti was announced to continue driving for Prema, progressing to the FIA Formula 3 Championship, partnering Formula Renault Eurocup champion Oscar Piastri and American Logan Sargeant. Vesti's first weekend at the Red Bull Ring was decent, scoring a fourth and sixth place. During the second Red Bull Ring round, he stormed to his first pole position in the championship. He controlled the race and won perfectly, despite it being cut short due to treacherous weather conditions. The next day, he finished in eighth place. Vesti had a torrid Budapest round, he was caught up in a collision during Race 1 after qualifying fourth. In Race 2, he worked his way up until 19th, before damaging his suspension in a collision with Jack Doohan, putting Vesti into retirement.

In the first Silverstone round, Vesti had a quiet weekend, scoring two fifth places. He scored fourth in qualifying for the second Silverstone round, and finished the races in fourth and eighth. Vesti had another weekend to forget in Barcelona, qualifying poorly in 15th. He barely progressed up the field in Race 1, before retiring with a mechanical issue on lap 9. He could only improve to 21st place in Race 2.

In Spa-Francorchamps, Vesti ended sixth in Race 1. However starting fifth in Race 2, Vesti worked his way to second place, taking his first podium since the second round. Vesti qualified sixth in Monza but was demoted to start ninth for impeding Jake Hughes in qualifying. He made a brilliant charge in Race 1, overtaking Théo Pourchaire on the third last lap and claiming his second win overalll, whilst helping Prema become the teams' champions. In Race 2, he had a race to forget despite climbing to third by lap 9, his effort would be undone as he touched teammate Sargeant, damaging Vesti's front wing and taking both out of the race. In Mugello during Race 1, he remained in third for the first 15 laps but passed Lirim Zendeli and Hughes within the next three. He battled with Hughes in the dying laps but managed to defend and secure his third win. In Race 2, Vesti ended in ninth place. His strong end to the season meant Vesti leaped to fourth in the standings with 146.5 points, 17.5 behind champion Piastri.

2021 

Vesti would sign for ART Grand Prix to race in Formula 3 alongside Russian Aleksandr Smolyar and American Juan Manuel Correa. After qualifying fifth during the first round in Barcelona, he started the season with seventh in Race 1. Vesti took his first podium of the season with a third place, gaining two places on the penultimate lap after Dennis Hauger and Matteo Nannini collided. In Race 3, Vesti had a slow start to the race, but recovered to finish seventh. In Paul Ricard, Vesti claimed his second pole overall. He had an underwhelming Race 1 and Race 2, taking only one point from the latter race. Vesti was passed by Hauger at the start of Race 3, and later struggled in the wet, losing positions to finish sixth. At the Red Bull Ring, Vesti would qualify second. In Race 1, Vesti stalled at the start but managed to progress to 13th, later being promoted to seventh due to multiple penalties. Vesti would finish second in the second race, inheriting a position on the penultimate lap when Victor Martins slowed. However in Race 3, he beat out polesitter Hauger early on and defended for his only win of the year.

In Budapest, he qualified seventh but was penalised three places for Race 1 due to driving unnecessarily slowly. Race 1 was to forget, as a hydraulic leak saw him retire entering lap 16. After not scoring points in Race 2, he bounced back with seventh place in the next race. He had a quiet Spa-Francorchamps round, taking fourth and two sixth places. In Zandvoort he qualified poorly in 13th place, but improved to ninth in the first race. In race 2, at which point he was mathematically out of the running for the title, Vesti returned to the podium in third place. He improved to eighth in the final race. Vesti qualified fourth in the Russia season finale, and ended P8 in the first race. Vesti finished second in the final race of the season at Sochi, after passing Clément Novalak late on. He thus overhauled Victor Martins to repeat his previous year's championship finish of fourth place, claiming one pole and a win each, and four more podiums.

FIA Formula 2 Championship

2022 

Vesti got his first taste of Formula 2 machinery when he participated in the post-season test in 2021 with ART Grand Prix alongside former F3 title rival Théo Pourchaire. On 21 January 2022, ART Grand Prix announced that Vesti would join the team for the 2022 season, alongside Pourchaire. Before the season, Vesti stated that he was "hoping to translate points into podiums" after his consistent F3 season. Vesti started his season poorly, failing to score points during the first two rounds, compounded by poor qualifying. During the third round in Imola, during the feature race, Vesti started on the soft tyres which allowed him to pit during an early safety car. With many rivals ahead on the alternate strategy, Vesti was able to claim his first points of the year by finishing sixth after which he stated that he needed to "work on qualifying". In Barcelona, he banished his qualifying woes to secure third. He finished seventh in the sprint race and ended up holding his position during the feature race, thus scoring his maiden podium in the category.

Vesti had a point-less weekend in Monaco, as another poor qualifying was caused by a red flag brought out by a rival. In Baku, Vesti qualified eighth. Late in the race, he seized on a mistake from Jehan Daruvala during the safety car restart to take the lead in the closing laps, to claim his maiden victory. Vesti stalled at the start of the feature race, but due to many rivals being involved in incidents, he stayed clean to secure seventh place. He qualified second on the front row in Silverstone, and finished sixth after a tight battle with Felipe Drugovich.  In the feature race, he had a terrible start and dropped four positions on the first lap. Still, he would recover to fifth despite losing fourth to Drugovich on the last lap. Vesti scored his first pole position of the season at the Red Bull Ring, vanquishing his previous qualifying struggles. He finished 12th in the sprint race as a track limit penalty deprived him of points. Vesti fitted wet tyres on a drying track and the strategy failed to work, which resulted in him falling down to 14th by the end of the race.

He qualified third in Paul Ricard, his third top 3 qualifying in a row. In the sprint race, he ended fifth after multiple penalties were applied post-race. In the feature race, he lost a position to Jack Doohan at the start but regained third place after the Australian spun whilst fighting teammate Pourchaire, adding another podium. In Budapest, Vesti ended the sprint race fifth, and made an overtaking masterclass on the alternate strategy during the later part of the race, although an early penalty costed him a podium. Heading into the summer break, Vesti stood sixth in the standings with 91 points.

However, his second half of his season would be poor, as he failed to score points in the Spa-Francorchamps and Zandvoort rounds, all due to more poor qualifying. In Monza, Vesti started on reverse pole for the sprint race by qualifying tenth. However, he was beaten by Jüri Vips during the lap 4 safety car restart, and was forced to settle for second place. In the feature race, a timely pit stop saw Vesti in a net position fourth place following the lap 11 safety car restart. He would gain positions when Marcus Armstrong had to serve a penalty, and Vesti also passed Ayumu Iwasa, earning him another second place as he would run out of time to catch winner Jehan Daruvala. He failed to score points during the Yas Marina finale. Vesti ended up ninth in the championship with 117 points, helping ART to third in the teams' standings whilst scoring one win, one pole and five podiums.

2023 
Following the season finale at Yas Marina, it would be announced that Vesti would move to Prema for the 2023 season alongside Ferrari junior Oliver Bearman. Vesti qualified fifth for the Bahrain opening round, but was penalised three places for the sprint due to impeding Arthur Leclerc. A gamble to pit in the sprint race failed to come through, ending up 17th. The feature race would be more disappointing for Vesti, as he retired after colliding into Richard Verschoor, and the former was given a five-place grid penalty for the next race.

Formula One 
On 19 January 2021, Vesti was announced as a Mercedes Junior Team driver.

Vesti drove for Mercedes during the 2022 Abu Dhabi young driver test at the Yas Marina Circuit. Overall, Vesti completed 124 laps around the circuit, good enough for 22nd fastest.

Personal life 
Vesti was born in a town called Vejle. He currently lives in Oxford and in the same flat with Alpine junior Olli Caldwell.

Karting record

Karting career summary

Racing record

Racing career summary

† As Vesti was a guest driver, he was ineligible to score points.
* Season still in progress.

Complete Formula Ford Denmark results
(key) (Races in bold indicate pole position) (Races in italics indicate fastest lap)

Complete F4 Danish Championship results 
(key) (Races in bold indicate pole position) (Races in italics indicate fastest lap)

Complete ADAC Formula 4 Championship results 
(key) (Races in bold indicate pole position) (Races in italics indicate fastest lap)

Complete FIA Formula 3 European Championship results 
(key) (Races in bold indicate pole position) (Races in italics indicate fastest lap)

Complete Macau Grand Prix results

Complete Formula Regional European Championship results 
(key) (Races in bold indicate pole position) (Races in italics indicate fastest lap)

Complete FIA Formula 3 Championship results 
(key) (Races in bold indicate pole position; races in italics indicate points for the fastest lap of top ten finishers)

† Driver did not finish, but was classified, as they completed more than 90% of race distance.
‡ Half points were awarded, as less than 75% of the scheduled distance was completed.

Complete FIA Formula 2 Championship results 
(key) (Races in bold indicate pole position) (Races in italics indicate points for the fastest lap of top ten finishers)

* Season still in progress.

References

External links 
 
 

2002 births
Living people
Danish racing drivers
ADAC Formula 4 drivers
FIA Formula 3 European Championship drivers
FIA Formula 3 Championship drivers
FIA Formula 2 Championship drivers
Formula Regional European Championship drivers
Van Amersfoort Racing drivers
Prema Powerteam drivers
ART Grand Prix drivers
People from Vejle Municipality
Sportspeople from the Region of Southern Denmark
Italian F4 Championship drivers
Karting World Championship drivers
Mercedes-AMG Motorsport drivers
United States F4 Championship drivers
Danish F4 Championship drivers
Danish expatriate sportspeople in England